The 1979 Detroit Lions season was the 50th season in franchise history. In the midst of a major rebuilding project, the woeful Lions finished the season with a 2–14 record, equal-worst record in the NFL and a tiebreaker with the 49ers gave the Lions the first pick overall in the 1980 NFL Draft. Detroit entered the year as a favorite in the NFC Central, but a season-ending injury to quarterback Gary Danielson in the preseason forced the Lions to ultimately turn to a rookie ninth-round pick, Jeff Komlo, behind center, with disastrous results.

Offseason

NFL Draft

Roster

Regular season

Schedule 

Note: Intra-division opponents are in bold text.

Standings

Player stats

Passing

Rushing

Receiving 
Note: Rec = Receptions; Yds = Yards; Avg = Average Yards per Reception; TD = Touchdowns

References 

 Detroit Lions on Pro Football Reference
 Detroit Lions on jt-sw.com
 Detroit Lions on The Football Database

Detroit Lions
Detroit Lions seasons
Detroit Lions